Porsgrunn/Skien is a Norwegian urban area located in Grenland in southern Telemark. 

The urban area covers parts of three municipalities: Skien, Porsgrunn and Bamble. The population is 85.408.

Porsgrunn
Skien
Bamble